Welcome to New York is a 2014 French-American drama film co-written and directed by Abel Ferrara. Inspired by the Dominique Strauss-Kahn affair when the prominent French politician was accused of sexual assaulting a hotel maid, the film was released on 17 May 2014 by VOD on the Internet as the film failed to secure a place on the Official Selection at the 2014 Cannes Film Festival (where it was given a special market screening), nor was it picked up for theatrical distribution in France.

According to Vincent Maraval, one of the producers, the film faced a boycott by the French media.

Synopsis
The film tells the story of a powerful man, a possible candidate for the Presidency of France, who lives a life of debauchery and is arrested after being accused of raping a maid at his hotel.

Cast
 Gérard Depardieu as George Devereaux
 Jacqueline Bisset as Simone Devereaux
 Marie Mouté as Sophie Devereaux
 Drena De Niro as Executive Assistant
 Amy Ferguson as Renee
 Paul Calderón as Pierre
 Ronald Guttman as Roullot
 Paul Hipp as Guy
 Anna Lakomy as Anna
 Natasha Romanova as Russian Yelena
 Aurelie Claudel as Air France VIP Escort
 John Patrick Barry as Port Authority Chief
 Anh Duong as Livia
 Kathryn Lillecrapp as Bebe
 Jim Heaphy as Detective Fitzgerald

Reception and lawsuit
On the review aggregator website Rotten Tomatoes, the film holds an approval rating of 77% based on 56 reviews. The website's critical consensus reads, "Led by a fearless performance from Gerard Depardieu, Welcome to New York is director Abel Ferrara at his most repulsive -- and most compulsively watchable."

Following its release – to mixed reviews varying from high praise to outright disgust – Strauss-Kahn said he would sue for slander. His lawyer also complained that the film's portrayal of Strauss-Kahn's then-wife, Anne Sinclair, was anti-Semitic. The film suggests Mrs. Deveraux's family profited from World War II. In fact, Sinclair's real family were French Jews who fled the country and had their property confiscated when Germany invaded. Sinclair echoed the criticism, but declined to press charges.

Ferrara, in a series of interviews with Indiewire, The Hollywood Reporter and other publications between September 2014 and March 2015, claimed that his distributor, Vincent Maraval of Wild Bunch, sold an unauthorized R-rated version of the film to IFC Films, for distribution in the US; the R-rated cut had already been released on Blu-ray and VOD in various European countries. Maraval subsequently responded that Ferrara had agreed on the R-rated cut to receive more financing for the film and had also contractually consented to lose final cut of the R-rated version if he did not deliver one by a certain date. Ferrara then stated his intent to send a cease-and-desist letter to Maraval and IFC, which issued its own statement also claiming that it had given Ferrara the chance to deliver his own R-rated cut for theatrical showings in the US, which he declined to do. As of March 27, the R-rated cut has only been shown at one American theater – the Roxie in San Francisco – though it is available in the US on VOD, and IFC has stated it intends to show it at additional theaters.

References

External links
 
 
 
 Official trailer at The Local

2014 films
2014 drama films
English-language French films
French drama films
American drama films
2010s French-language films
Films directed by Abel Ferrara
Films set in New York City
Films à clef
2014 multilingual films
French multilingual films
American multilingual films
Dominique Strauss-Kahn
2010s English-language films
2010s American films
2010s French films